The 686th Aircraft Control and Warning Squadron is an inactive United States Air Force unit. It was last assigned to the Oklahoma City Air Defense Sector, Aerospace Defense Command, stationed at Walker Air Force Base, New Mexico. It was inactivated on 1 August 1963.

The unit was a General Surveillance Radar squadron providing for the air defense of the United States.

Lineage
 Established as the 686th Aircraft Control and Warning Squadron
 Activated on 1 October 1953
 Discontinued and inactivated on 1 August 1963

Assignments
 34th Air Division, 1 October 1953
 Albuquerque Air Defense Sector, 1 January 1960
 Oklahoma City Air Defense Sector, 15 September 1960
 4752d Air Defense Wing, 1 September 1961
 Oklahoma City Air Defense Sector, 25 June-1 August 1963

Stations
 Walker AFB, New Mexico, 1 October 1953 – 1 August 1963

References

  Cornett, Lloyd H. and Johnson, Mildred W., A Handbook of Aerospace Defense Organization  1946 - 1980,  Office of History, Aerospace Defense Center, Peterson AFB, CO (1980).
 Winkler, David F. & Webster, Julie L., Searching the Skies, The Legacy of the United States Cold War Defense Radar Program,  US Army Construction Engineering Research Laboratories, Champaign, IL (1997).

External links

Radar squadrons of the United States Air Force
Aerospace Defense Command units